Hans Linde (born 4 February 1979) is a Swedish former politician of the Left Party. He was a member of the Riksdag from 2006 to 2017. From October 2010 to February 2016, Linde was group leader of the Left Party parliamentary group.

Linde was elected national chairman of Swedish Association for Sexuality Education in June 2017. He subsequently resigned his seat in the Riksdag and revoked his membership of the Left Party.

References

External links

Hans Linde at the Riksdag website

Members of the Riksdag from the Left Party (Sweden)
Living people
1979 births
People from Gothenburg
Articles containing video clips
21st-century Swedish politicians